Frank Phillips College is a public community college in Borger, Texas. The college also manages the Allen Campus in Perryton in Ochiltree County, the Dalhart Center in Hartley County, and the Cosmetology Center in Hereford in Deaf Smith County.

References

External links
Official website

Two-year colleges in the United States
Universities and colleges accredited by the Southern Association of Colleges and Schools
Community colleges in Texas
Education in Hutchinson County, Texas
Education in Ochiltree County, Texas
Buildings and structures in Hutchinson County, Texas
Buildings and structures in Ochiltree County, Texas
NJCAA athletics